Saronikos may refer to the following places in Greece:

the Saronic Gulf (Saronikos Kolpos)
Saronikos, Attica, a municipality in East Attica
Saronikos, Corinthia, a municipal unit of Corinth